The 1932 World Table Tennis Championships men's doubles was the sixth edition of the men's doubles championship.
Miklós Szabados and Viktor Barna defeated Laszlo Bellak and Sándor Glancz in the final by three sets to one win a fourth consecutive title.

Results

See also
List of World Table Tennis Championships medalists

References

-